Irwin Dambrot (May 24, 1928 – January 21, 2010) was an American basketball player, best known for his college career at the City College of New York.

Early life

Dambrot was born in the Bronx and attended William Howard Taft High School in the South Bronx.

Basketball career

Dambrot was a first-round draft pick of the New York Knicks and the Most Outstanding Player of the 1950 NCAA basketball tournament.

A 6-foot–4, 175–pound forward,  He played for coach Nat Holman at the City College of New York (CCNY), where he was a senior captain in 1950 and led the Beavers to a 24–5 record and the NCAA basketball championship, earning MVP honors in the tournament.  After the season, Dambrot was named to the Helms Athletic Foundation Basketball All-America team.

Dambrot's CCNY team also won the 1950 National Invitation Tournament (NIT), the only time that one school has won both the NCAA and NIT tournaments in the same season.  Dambrot was the only senior starter on the CCNY roster that season.

A January 19, 2003, article in the New York Daily News described Dambrot as "a sharp-shooting forward known for his relentless enthusiasm."

Dambrot was selected in the first round (seventh overall) by the New York Knicks in the 1950 NBA draft, though he chose a career in dentistry after graduating from Columbia University Dental School.

On March 26, 1951, Dambrot and his CCNY teammates Ed Roman, Ed Warner, Norm Mager, Al "Fats" Roth, Herb Cohen, and Floyd Layne were arrested on charges of shaving points in three games during the 1949–50 season. They pleaded guilty to misdemeanor charges of point shaving.  All received suspended sentences, except for Warner, who received a six-month prison sentence because he had a prior run-in with the law.

According to a March 20, 1996, article in the New York Times by Ira Berkow, "the CCNY players who were convicted had accepted bribes from gamblers not to throw games, but to keep them under the point spreads.  The players received just a few thousand dollars for their efforts, which took place during the season, but not during tournament games."

Dambrot's nephew, Keith Dambrot, coached LeBron James when the future NBA star was at St. Vincent–St. Mary High School, and he is the current head basketball coach at the Duquesne University.

Later life and death
Irwin Dambrot lived his final years in Mendham, New Jersey. He died at age 81 at a hospital in Summit, New Jersey, after having suffered from Parkinson's disease for some time. He is interred at Locust Hill Cemetery in Dover, New Jersey.

See also
 CCNY Point Shaving Scandal
 City Dump: The Story of the 1951 CCNY Basketball Scandal

References

External links
Daily News Tribute to Irwin Dambrot
N.Y. Times Obituary for Irwin Dambrot

1928 births
2010 deaths
American men's basketball players
Basketball players from New York City
CCNY Beavers men's basketball players
Forwards (basketball)
New York Knicks draft picks
Sportspeople from the Bronx